Thamnochortus is a group of plants in the Restionaceae described as a genus in 1767. The entire genus is endemic to Cape Province in South Africa.

 Species

 formerly included
moved to other genera: Cannomois Hypodiscus Restio Rhodocoma Staberoha

References

Restionaceae
Endemic flora of South Africa
Flora of the Cape Provinces
Fynbos
Poales genera